The Living Desert Zoo and Gardens State Park, formerly the Living Desert Zoological and Botanical State Park, is a zoo and botanical garden displaying plants and animals of the Chihuahuan Desert in their native habitats. It is located off U.S. Route 285 at the north edge of Carlsbad, New Mexico, at an elevation of  atop the Ocotillo Hills overlooking the city and the Pecos River. It is open every day except Christmas.

The park has been an accredited member of the Association of Zoos and Aquariums (AZA) since 2002.

Exhibits

The zoo features more than forty native animal species, including pronghorn, badger, bison, bobcats, mule deer, elk, kit fox, Gila monster, cougar, prairie dogs, reptiles, fourteen species of snakes, and  Mexican wolves. An aviary contains golden eagles, hawks, owls, a roadrunner, songbirds, and turkeys. The gardens feature a greenhouse and hundreds of cacti and succulents from around the world, including acacia, agave, small barrel cactus, cholla, ocotillo, prickly pear, saguaro, sotol (Dasylirion wheeleri), and yucca.

 of self-guided trails lead through sand dunes, arroyos, and pinyon pine/juniper forest.

See also 
 List of botanical gardens in the United States

References

External links
 
 Living Desert Zoo and Gardens State Park
 Living Desert Zoo and Gardens State Park - Visit Carlsbad New Mexico

Botanical gardens in New Mexico
Flora of the Chihuahuan Desert
State parks of New Mexico
Parks in Eddy County, New Mexico
Protected areas established in 1967
Zoos in New Mexico
Zoos established in 1967
1967 establishments in New Mexico